White Hall is an unincorporated community in Albemarle County, Virginia.

"Whitehall, in the northwestern portion of the county, was an election precinct known as Glenn's Store, William Maupin's Store, Maupin's Tavern, Miller's Store, Shumate's Tavern, until 1835. Then, it was named Whitehall for a White family living in the community. Pop. 55; elev. 722."

Whitehall was an election district, and was also previously named Glenn's Store; William Maupin's Store; Maupin's Tavern; Miller's Tavern; Shumate's Tavern, until the present name was established in 1835.

The Virginia house of Delegates passed Bill 111 on December 19, 1849 for a survey of a road from Shumate's Tavern to Covington, Virginia in Alleghany County, Virginia. In January 1849 a grant in aid was proposed to intersect the turnpike from Vance's on the Huntersville and Warm Springs Turnpike to the Jackson's River Turnpike at John Shumate's Tavern, a distance of about 15 miles.

References

External links
 White Hall Community

Unincorporated communities in Virginia
Unincorporated communities in Albemarle County, Virginia